Minor Raja is a 1991 Telugu-language comedy drama film, produced by V. Rambabu, K. P. Panakala Rao under the Rakesh Productions banner and directed by Katragadda Ravi Teja. It stars Rajendra Prasad, Shobana and Rekha, with music composed by Vidyasagar. The film is remake of the Tamil film Mallu Vetti Minor (1990). The film was a box office failure.

Plot 
Minor Raja (Rajendra Prasad), was a rich man and wayward village playboy, who spent his time in brothels like his father. Santhana Lakshmi (Shobhana) and Minor Raja fell in love with each other. Minor Raja and President (Kota Srinivasa Rao) were in a feud for several years. In a misunderstanding, When Minor Raja's detractors wrongly accuse a teacher Seeta (Rekha) of having an affair with him, he decides to marry her to save her the humiliation. Minor Raja had to marry her. A few years later, Minor Raja became the perfect husband and had a son. While Santhana Lakshmi was still unmarried, she teased Minor Raja whenever she got the opportunity. One day, it was "the straw that broke the camel's back" so the angry Minor Raja raped Santhana Lakshmi. The rest of the story is about what happens to Minor Raja, Seeta, and Santhana Lakshmi.

Cast 

Rajendra Prasad as Minor Raja
Shobana as Santhana Lakshmi
Rekha as Seeta
Kota Srinivasa Rao
Brahmanandam
Mallikarjuna Rao
Narra Venkateswara Rao
Gundu Hanumantha Rao
Subbaraya Sharma
Sanjeevi
Anitha
Mamatha
Chilakala Radha
Jaya Malini
Y. Vijaya

Soundtrack 
Music composed by Vidyasagar. Music released on Surya Music Company.

References

External links 
 

1990 comedy-drama films
1990s Telugu-language films
Films scored by Vidyasagar
Indian comedy-drama films
Telugu remakes of Tamil films